The Otoro language (Utoro, Dhitoro, Litoro) is a Niger–Congo language in the Heiban family spoken in Kordofan, Sudan.

It is also called Kawama (Kawarma). Dialects are Dugujur, Dukwara, Dorobe, Dogoridi.

Bibliography 
 Kodi, Musa, et al. 2002. Otoro Alphabet Story Book. Sudan: Sudan Workshop Programme.

References

Heiban languages
Severely endangered languages